Gizella 'Gizi' Farkas (18 November 1925 in Miskolc – 17 June 1996 in Vienna) was a female international table tennis player from Hungary.

Table tennis career
From 1947 to 1960 she won many medals in singles, doubles, and team events in the Table Tennis European Championships and in the World Table Tennis Championships.

Farkas is recognised as one of the leading female players in the history of the sport. Of the 27 World Championship medals that she won  they included ten gold medals; three in the singles at the 1947 World Table Tennis Championships, 1948 World Table Tennis Championships and 1949 World Table Tennis Championships, three in the doubles and four in the mixed doubles.

Personal life
She married three times to László Fekete, Andorné Gervai and Mihály Lantos. From 1974 until her death, she lived in Austria.

See also
 List of table tennis players
 List of World Table Tennis Championships medalists

References

1925 births
1996 deaths
Hungarian female table tennis players
Hungarian expatriate sportspeople in Austria
Sportspeople from Miskolc